was the fifty-eighth of the sixty-nine stations of the Nakasendō connecting Edo with Kyoto in Edo period Japan. It is located in former Mino Province in what is now part of the town of Sekigahara, Fuwa District, Gifu Prefecture, Japan.

History
Sekigahara is a strategically important location as is located at the entrance to a narrow pass that was the only land route between Mino Province and Ōmi Province. The name came from a barrier and checkpoint called the "Kuwano-no-seki", which existed since the Asuka period to guard the approaches to the capital from the east. The checkpoint fell out of use in then Heian period, but was received by the Tokugawa Shogunate. The village was also at a junction of the Nakasendō with the Hokkoku Kaidō towards the Sea of Japan and the Ise Kaidō to the Ise Grand Shrine.  Due to its location, this area was the site of many battles throughout history, from the Asuka-period Jinshin War to the 1601 Battle of Sekigahara.

In the early Edo period, the system of post stations on the Nakasendō was formalized by the Tokugawa shogunate in 1602, and it became a stopping place for traveling merchants who originated from Ōmi Province.  It was also on the sankin-kōtai route used by various western daimyō to-and-from the Shogun's court in Edo.  Sekigahara is 443 kilometers from Edo. Sekigahara Pass has some of the heaviest snowfalls in Japan, and travelers trapped by early snowfall in autumn were forced to spend time at Sekigahara-juku until the road became passable. 

Modern Sekigahara is a tourist destination for the locations related to the Battle of Sekigahara. Part of the checkpoint buildings named Fuwano Checkpoint are still standing. But the most of the old buildings have been destroyed when the road was modernized and widened allow for a modern motorway and the railway line to pass through.

Sekigahara-juku in The Sixty-nine Stations of the Kiso Kaidō
Utagawa Hiroshige's ukiyo-e print of Sekigahara-juku dates from 1835 -1838. The print depicts travelers seated at a roadside noodle shop, which has signs advertising "Satomochi", a sweet rice cake that was a speciality of this area. Straw hats and straw sandals are also on sale. A man leading a packhorse is observing the scene. In the background is another teahouse and many travelers are heading towards it, indicating the busy nature of this post station.

Neighboring post towns
Nakasendō
Tarui-juku - Sekigahara-juku - Imasu-juku

References

External links

Hiroshige Kiso-Kaido series
Sekigahara-juku on Kiso Kaido Road
Gifu Nakasendo Guide

Notes

Stations of the Nakasendō
Post stations in Gifu Prefecture
Sekigahara, Gifu
Mino Province